Anthony D. Williams (born 1974) is a consultant, researcher, and author. He co-authored Wikinomics along with Don Tapscott and is a vice president of research with international think tank New Paradigm. His work has been featured in publications including Business Week and The Globe and Mail and the Times of India. Williams is also the CEO and Co-Founder of Canadian think-tank, The DEEP Centre.

Williams holds a Masters in Research in Political Science from the London School of Economics and is a PhD candidate in the Government Department of the University.

References

Homepage
Biography at Business Week
Biography at Penguin Group

Living people
Alumni of the London School of Economics
Canadian technology writers
1974 births